The Women's synchronized 10 metre platform competition of the diving events at the 2015 World Aquatics Championships was held on 27 July 2015.

Results
The preliminary round was held at 10:00. The final was held at 19:30.

Green denotes finalists

References

Women's synchronized 10 metre platform